Alec Michael John Wright, CMG (19 September 1912 – 26 January 2018) was a chartered surveyor and Director of Public Works of Hong Kong. He was a longtime colonial civil servant and chief architect of the Public Works Department. He was also an official member of the Legislative Council and Urban Council. He was responsible for many infrastructure and housing projects and advocated for private bathroom and kitchen in every unit of the housing estate which is known as the "Wright Principle". He was the founding member and president of the Hong Kong Institute of Architects.

Biography
Wright was born in Hong Kong on 19 September 1912 into a civil servant family. He was educated at the Brentwood School in the United Kingdom and became an architect. He joined the Hong Kong government in 1938 and began to work at the former Public Works Department. He was interned during the Japanese occupation of Hong Kong.

After the war, Wright became the chief architect of the Public Works Department and played an instrumental role in the massive effort to house the millions of refugees fleeing to Hong Kong from China. The first generation of public housing estates, built in haste, resembled army barracks, and had shared bathrooms. In 1952 he designed the first public rental housing estate with private bathrooms and kitchens, at Sheung Li Uk, for the Hong Kong Housing Society, in which his design became known as the "Wright Principle". He was also founding member and president of the Hong Kong Institute of Architects in 1958.

In 1963, he became Director of Public Works in which he served until 1969. In this capacity, Wright was also an official member of the Legislative Council and Urban Council.

In 1969, he was appointed Hong Kong Commissioner in London. He retired from the civil service in 1973. Hong Kong Housing Society's Lai Tak Tsuen in Tai Hang, built in 1975 and 1976, was named after Wright's Chinese name.

He resided in Knightsbridge, London after his retirement. He commented on Hong Kong affairs occasionally, including the proposed demolition of the Government Hill in 2012. Wright died in January 2018 at the age of 105.

See also
 Architecture of Hong Kong
 Public housing in Hong Kong
 Lai Tak Tsuen
 Hong Kong Club

References

1912 births
2018 deaths
Companions of the Order of St Michael and St George
Government officials of Hong Kong
Hong Kong architects
Hong Kong surveyors
Members of the Legislative Council of Hong Kong
Members of the Urban Council of Hong Kong
People educated at Brentwood School, Essex
World War II civilian prisoners held by Japan
Hong Kong people of British descent
Hong Kong centenarians
English centenarians
Men centenarians
Hong Kong emigrants to the United Kingdom